The nuraghe Genna Maria is an archaeological site in the comune of Villanovaforru, province of South Sardinia.

It is located atop a hill in the Marmilla region, in the province of Sud Sardegna in Sardinia. The structure is complex, formed by an original central tower, built in the middle Bronze Age (2200-1600 BC), to which later were added other four towers and a bastion. One of the four towers was subsequently sacrificed during a further intervention, that also saw, presumably, the edification of the mighty external wall of hexagonal shape.

In the early Iron Age in the site developed a new village.

The Nuraghic complex 

The Nuragic complex originally consisted of the central Nuraghe (Mastio) tomb, which was built about 1350 BC, as well as three tombs which were established about 1000 BC. This complex was later surrounded by outer walls. The outer wall spans a wide courtyard in a stretched hexagonal shape. The interest of archaeologists is primarily focused on this village. It dates back to the Iron Age around 800 BC. This period is called the "geometric epoch" because of the characteristic decorations on the ceramics. A parallel development is represented by the geometric-ceramic epoch in Greece (900-700 BC). According to sources, contacts with Greece were established during the Mycenaean period.

The complex was damaged by fire and abandoned in the 8th century BC. Later, in the 5th or 4th century BC, at the time of the Punic occupation of parts of Sardinia, people again came to the Nuraghe Genna Maria. The Sardinian-Punic population set up a small sanctuary in the buried Nuraghes. The preserved wall remains of the Nuraghes, which were already repaired several times in ancient times, are a maximum of three meters high.

Discovery 
During the archaeological excavations of the poorly preserved Nuraghic, which began in 1977 and lasted for 30 years, there were valuable materials found in the area. Ceramics, grinding stones, plant remains were excavated and researched by the Chair of Genetics of the University of Cagliari.

The finds are exhibited in a museum named after the complex in the center of Villanovaforru.

See also 
 History of Sardinia

References

Bibliography
E. Contu, "L'architettura nuragica", in Ichnussa. La Sardegna dalle origini all'età classica, Milano, Scheiwiller, 1981;
U. Badas, "Genna Maria - Villanovaforru (Cagliari). I vani 10/18. Nuovi apporti allo studio delle abitazioni a corte centrale", in Atti del III Convegno di Studi "Un Millennio di relazioni tra la Sardegna e i paesi del Mediterraneo" (Selargius-Cagliari, 27-30 novembre 1986), Cagliari, 1987;
C. Lilliu, "Un culto di età punico-romana al nuraghe Genna Maria di Villanovaforru", in Quaderni della Soprintendenza archeologica per le province di Cagliari e Oristano, 5, 1988, pp. 109–128;
"Villanovaforru", in L'Antiquarium Arborense e i civici musei archeologici della Sardegna, a cura di G. Lilliu, Cinisello Balsamo, A. Pizzi, 1988, pp. 181–198;
U. Badas, "Nuraghe Genna Maria (Villanovaforru - Cagliari)", in Guide Archeologiche. Preistoria e protostoria in Italia, Forlì, UISP, 1995, pp. 162–169.

Buildings and structures in Sardinia
Archaeological sites in Sardinia
Former populated places in Italy
Tourist attractions in Sardinia
Nuraghe